William Thomson, 1st Baron Kelvin was a prolific scientific scholar who gave his name to several things.

Science and engineering
The SI unit of temperature, kelvin
 Kelvin, a unit of measure for color temperature
 Kelvin balance
Joule–Thomson effect
Joule–Thomson (Kelvin) coefficient
Kelvin's circulation theorem
Kelvin–Helmholtz instability
Kelvin–Helmholtz mechanism
 Kelvin–Helmholtz luminosity
Kelvin-Helmholtz time scale
Kelvin–Planck statement of the 2nd law of thermodynamics
Kelvin–Varley divider
Kelvin's balls
Kelvin bridge
Kelvin effect, see either Thomson effect or Kelvin equation
Kelvin equation
Kelvin–Voigt material, also:
Kelvin material
Kelvin solid
Kelvin notation
Kelvin probe force microscope
Kelvin sensing
Kelvin water dropper
Kelvin wave
Thomson bridge,  see Kelvin bridge
Thomson effect, Thomson–Seebeck effect:  see Thermoelectric effect
 Kelvin Gold Medal, British engineering prize named after Lord Kelvin
 Kelvin Medal and Prize, British physics prize named after Lord Kelvin
Kelvin cat's eye pattern
Kelvin wake pattern
Kelvin angle
Kelvin’s heat death paradox
Zero Kelvin
Kelvin–Stokes theorem
Kelvin functions
Kelvin problem/Kelvin conjecture/Kelvin structure/Kelvin foam
Kelvin transform
Kelvin (microarchitecture)

Places
Kelvin, North Dakota 
Rupes Kelvin
Promontorium Kelvin 
Kelvin Island (Lake Nipigon) .

Other
The Kelvin Building in the University of Glasgow
 , a cable ship
Kelvin High School, public high school in Winnipeg, Manitoba, Canada
8003 Kelvin

See also
Kelvin (disambiguation)

References

William Thomson, 1st Baron Kelvin
K